Bibanga Airport  is an airstrip serving the village of Bibanga in Kasai-Oriental Province, Democratic Republic of the Congo.

See also

 Transport in the Democratic Republic of the Congo
 List of airports in the Democratic Republic of the Congo

References

External links
 OpenStreetMap - Bibanga Airport
 OurAirports - Bibanga Airport
 FallingRain - Bibanga Airport
 HERE Maps - Bibanga Airport
 

Airports in Kasaï-Oriental